The 1985 New England Patriots season was the franchise's 16th season in the National Football League (NFL) and 26th overall. The Patriots had a record of eleven wins and five losses and finished third in the AFC East Division. They then became the first team in NFL history ever to advance to the Super Bowl by winning three playoff games on the road, defeating the New York Jets 26–14 in the AFC wild card game, the Los Angeles Raiders 27–20 in the AFC Divisional Game and the Miami Dolphins 31–14 in the AFC Championship game. The Patriots' win in Miami was their first victory in that stadium since 1966 and while they did defeat Miami on the road in 1969 that game was played in Tampa Bay. The win over the Dolphins in the game has gone down as one of the greatest upsets in NFL history, as the Dolphins were heavily favored.

But despite the Patriots' success in the playoffs, they proved unable to compete with the acclaimed 15–1 Chicago Bears in Super Bowl XX, losing 46–10 in what was at the time the most lopsided defeat in Super Bowl history. The Patriots were held to a Super Bowl record of just 7 rushing yards and their quarterbacks, Tony Eason and Steve Grogan, were sacked a combined 7 times by the powerful Bears defense.

"We couldn't protect the quarterback and that was my fault.  I couldn't come up with a system to handle the Bears' pass rush," head coach Raymond Berry acknowledged.

Personnel

Staff

Roster

align="center"
! Week || Date || Opponent || Result || Game site || Record || Attendance
|-style="background: #ddffdd;"
|align="center"| 1 || September 8, 1985 || Green Bay Packers || W 26–20 || Sullivan Stadium ||align="center"|  1–0 ||align="center"|  49,488
|-style="background: #ffdddd;"
|align="center"| 2 || September 15, 1985 || at Chicago Bears || L 20–7 || Soldier Field ||align="center"|  1–1 ||align="center"|  60,533
|-style="background: #ddffdd;"
|align="center"| 3 || September 22, 1985 || at Buffalo Bills || W 17–14 || Rich Stadium ||align="center"|  2–1 ||align="center"|  40,334
|-style="background: #ffdddd;"
|align="center"| 4 || September 29, 1985 || Los Angeles Raiders || L 35–20 || Sullivan Stadium ||align="center"|  2–2 ||align="center"|  60,686
|-style="background: #ffdddd;"
|align="center"| 5 || October 6, 1985 || at Cleveland Browns || L 24–20 || Cleveland Municipal Stadium  ||align="center"|  2–3 ||align="center"|  62,139
|-style="background: #ddffdd;"
|align="center"| 6 || October 13, 1985 || Buffalo Bills || W 28–6 || Sullivan Stadium  ||align="center"|  3–3 ||align="center"|  40,462
|-style="background: #ddffdd;"
|align="center"| 7 || October 20, 1985 || New York Jets ||W 20–13 || Sullivan Stadium ||align="center"|  4–3 ||align="center"|  58,163
|-style="background: #ddffdd;"
|align="center"| 8 || October 27, 1985 || at Tampa Bay Buccaneers ||W 32–14 || Tampa Stadium  ||align="center"| 5–3 ||align="center"|  34,661
|-style="background: #ddffdd;"
|align="center"| 9 || November 3, 1985 || Miami Dolphins ||W 17–13|| Sullivan Stadium  ||align="center"| 6–3 ||align="center"|  58,811
|-style="background: #ddffdd;"
|align="center"| 10 || November 10, 1985 || Indianapolis Colts ||W 34–15 || Sullivan Stadium ||align="center"| 7–3 ||align="center"|  54,176
|-style="background: #ddffdd;"
|align="center"| 11 || November 17, 1985 || at Seattle Seahawks ||W 20–13 || The Kingdome  ||align="center"| 8–3 ||align="center"|  60,345
|-style="background: #ffdddd;"
|align="center"| 12 || November 24, 1985 || at New York Jets || L 16–13 (OT) || The Meadowlands || align="center"| 8–4 ||align="center"|  74,100
|-style="background: #ddffdd;"
|align="center"| 13 || December 1, 1985 || at Indianapolis Colts ||W 38–31 || Hoosier Dome ||  align="center"| 9–4 ||align="center"|  56,740
|-style="background: #ddffdd;"
|align="center"| 14 || December 8, 1985 || Detroit Lions || W 23–6 || Sullivan Stadium  ||  align="center"| 10–4 ||align="center"|  59,078
|-style="background: #ffdddd;"
|align="center"| 15 || December 16, 1985 || at Miami Dolphins ||L 30–27 || Miami Orange Bowl ||align=center| 10–5 ||align="center"|  69,489
|-style="background: #ddffdd;"
|align="center"| 16 || December 22, 1985 || Cincinnati Bengals ||W 34–23 || Sullivan Stadium ||align=center| 11–5 ||align="center"|  57,953
|}

Game summaries

Week 1

Week 2

Week 3

Week 4

Week 5

Week 6

Week 7 vs Jets

Week 8

Week 9

Week 10

Week 11

Week 12

Week 13

Week 14

Week 15

Week 16

    
    
    
    
    
    
    
    
    
    
    

After winning against the Bengals, fans stormed the field and tore down the goal posts.  Fans proceeded to walk down Route 1 with the goalposts, accidentally hitting an overhead wire and nearly electrocuting themselves.

Postseason

Wild Card 

This was only the second postseason win in Patriots history, and the first since 1963.

Divisional

Conference Championship 

In the 1986 AFC Championship Game, the Patriots ran the ball on 59 out of 71 offensive plays, amassing 255 rushing yards in an upset of the favored Dolphins.

Super Bowl

Standings

References

New England Patriots
American Football Conference championship seasons
New England Patriots seasons
New England Patriots
Sports competitions in Foxborough, Massachusetts